The Journal of Addiction Medicine is a bimonthly peer-reviewed medical journal covering addiction medicine. It was established in 2007 and is published by Lippincott Williams & Wilkins on behalf of the American Society of Addiction Medicine, of which it is the official journal. The editor-in-chief is Richard Saitz (Boston University), who assumed this position on January 1, 2015. The previous editor-in-chief was George Koob. According to the Journal Citation Reports, the journal has a 2017 impact factor of 2.406.

References

External links

Addiction medicine journals
Academic journals associated with learned and professional societies
Publications established in 2007
Bimonthly journals
Lippincott Williams & Wilkins academic journals
English-language journals